Aaj Ka Ye Ghar is a 1976 Bollywood film directed by Surendra Shailaj. The film stars Helen.

Cast

Shriram Lagoo - Sajjan
Jaymala
Romesh Sharma - Vijay
Helen - Miss Ruhi
A. K. Hangal - Dinanath
Lalita Pawar - Mrs. Shanti Dinanath
Jalal Agha - Nutan Chandra
Madan Puri - Sajjan's Father-in-law
I. S. Johar - Painter
Chandrashekhar - Malik, Sajjan's Boss
Ramesh Deo - Deshpande
Master Tito - Pankaj
Duggal - House Servant
Navprith Komal - Baby Mona
Jagirdar
A. U. Khatri

Crew
Director - Surendra Shailaj
Screenplay - B. K. Adarsh
Dialogue - M. G. Hashmat, Surendra Shailaj
Producer - Jaymala
Editor - Ravikumar Patankar
Cinematographer - Surendra Sinha
Art Director - Roshan
Music Director - Anil Mohile, Arun Paudwal
Lyricist - M. G. Hashmat
Playback Singers - Kishore Kumar, Anuradha Paudwal, Adolf

Music

References

External links
 

1976 films
1970s Hindi-language films